Sugar and Spice is an Australian children's television series that was broadcast on ABC TV between 1988 and 1989.

Starring Radha Mitchell as Pixie Robinson and Michelle Kearley as Molly Wilson, the series was set in the 1920s and revolved around two eleven-year-old girls from the Australian bush, who were sent to live with Pixie's grandmother to attend the same private high-school in the city.

The Complete Series was released on DVD in 2008 by Force Entertainment.

Cast

starring 
 Radha Mitchell as Pixie Robertson
 Michelle Kearley as Molly Wilson

Relatives 
 Howard Bell as Mr Robertson
 Louise Siversen as Mrs Beatrice Robertson
 Colwyn Roberts as Mr Wilson
 Ruth Yaffe as Mrs Edna Wilson
 Penelope Shelton as Grandma
 Louise Hall as Aunt Vera
 Susan Ellis as Anne
 Eamonn Kelly as Jimmy
 Matthew Newton as Freddo

Friends 
 Earl Francis as Captain Jack
 Esme Melville as Mrs Watson

Teachers 
 Judith Graham as Mrs Meyer
 Marijke Mann as Miss Orrick
 Victor Kazan as Jacques Chevrier
 Lindy McConchie (Davini Malcolm) as Miss Pittman

Students 
 Vivienne Walshe as Marguerite Chevrier
 Rana Melville-Smith as Louise
 Belinda Hutchinson as Lucy Forrest
 Penelope MacGowan as Elsie
 Georgia Falcke as Mary
 Samantha Payne as Esmerelda
 Bindi Edwards as Myrtle
 Sarah Young as Edith
 Nathalie Woolcock as Ruth
 Kyra Opray as Meg
 Emily Chen as Emily
 Elizabeth Catherall as Edna
 Kirsten Geary as Ruby
 Sandra Willis as Sandra

Episode list
 Going Ready or Not.
 The Arrival
 Froggy
 The Best of Enemies
 Guiding Hands
The Haunted House
 A String of Pearls
 The Picnic
 To See or Not to See
 The Barnstormer
  What's Cooking
  Birds, Bees and Rabiits
 Money Troubles
 The Camp Out
  The Substitute
 Creating a New Molly
  Exam time
  True or False
  The Pageant
  Ending or Beginnings

Book 
 Mary Wright: Sugar and Spice, Puffin Books, 1988,

See also
 List of programs broadcast by ABC Television
 List of Australian television series

References

1. The Complete Series: Sugar and Spice, DVD, Force Entertainment, 2008

External links
 
 Sugar and Spice at australiantelevision.net

1988 Australian television series debuts
1989 Australian television series endings
Australian children's television series